A Hawk and A Hacksaw and the Hun Hangár Ensemble is an EP by A Hawk and a Hacksaw and The Hun Hangár Ensemble  released in 2007 on The Leaf Label. A 20-minute bonus DVD was released with the CD, titled An Introduction to A Hawk and a Hacksaw. The DVD documents two years of touring by original band members Jeremy Barnes and Heather Trost with live footage (by director Dave Herman), as well as a behind-the-scenes look at their travels across Europe.

Track listing
 "Kiraly Siratás" – 2:32
 "Zozobra" – 4:01
 "Serbian Cŏcek" – 4:14
 "Romanian Hora and Bulgar" (live) – 3:15
 "Ihabibi" – 3:57
 "Vajdaszentivány" – 2:36
 "Oriental Hora" – 5:18
 "Dudanotak" – 3:29

The original melodies
Kiraly Siratás, album's opening track, is based around the main melody from Bedřich Smetana 19th-century piece "Vltava". The flowing melody is carried by Heather Trost's violin, accompanied by the sound of a cymbalom. Serbian Cŏcek (or Čoček) is based around the melody of Marko Nešić's piece titled "Kad sam bio mlađan lovac ja" (When I was a young hunter). Oriental Hora is centered on the traditional klezmer melody. Vajdaszentivány is based on a Hungarian song called "Titkon nyílik".

Personnel
Griffin Rodriguez – mastering 
Zsolt Kürtosi – upright bass
Jeremy Barnes – accordion, cymbals, drums, glockenspiel, gong, bells, cowbell, sleigh bells,  arranger, engineer, mixing 
Béla Ágoston – bagpipes, clarinet, alto sax 
Nick Hall – design
Zach Condon – mandolin, trumpet, ukulele 
Heather Trost – arranger, cello, viola, violin
Balázs Unger - cymbalom
Ferenc Kovács - trumpet, violin
Paul Collins – bouzouki

A Hawk and a Hacksaw albums
2007 EPs
2007 video albums
Documentary films about music and musicians
The Leaf Label albums